The Issaquah Alps is the unofficial name for the highlands near Issaquah, Washington, a suburb of Seattle, including Cougar Mountain, Squak Mountain, Tiger Mountain, Taylor Mountain, Rattlesnake Ridge, Rattlesnake Mountain, and Grand Ridge. The term was invented in 1977 by noted nature author Harvey Manning within the pages of his trail guidebook Footsore 1, elevating their status from foothills to "Alps" to advocate preservation.  Manning himself lived on a developed section of Cougar Mountain in his "200 meter hut".

In 1979, Harvey Manning helped to found the Issaquah Alps Trails Club to care for the trails and to push for public ownership of the Alps. The IATC, which is headquartered in Issaquah (nicknamed "Trailhead City"), conducts frequent guided hikes throughout the Alps.

The Issaquah Alps follow Interstate 90 from the shore of Lake Washington almost to the western face of the Cascade Range. The hills are composed of andesitic volcanic rock lying on top of older tightly folded rocks from the coastal plain of the North Cascade subcontinent that docked with Washington about 50 million years ago as the entire continent of North America moved west across the ocean. The Alps were heavily eroded by glaciers in the last ice age. The Vashon lobe of the ice sculpted Rattlesnake Ledge, steeply carved the east and west sides of Squak Mountain, and deposited a large erratic on Cougar Mountain, Fantastic Erratic.

Cedar Butte rises abruptly from the moraine between Rattlesnake Ledge and the absolute front of the Cascades. It is sometimes considered part of the Issaquah Alps but it is a relatively young symmetrical volcanic cone and is therefore more closely related to neighboring Mount Washington to the east than the old weathered hills of the majority of the Alps.

Summits
 Cougar Mountain, elevation 
 Squak Mountain, elevation 
 Taylor Mountain, elevation 
 Tiger Mountain
 Middle Tiger Mountain, elevation 
 East Tiger Mountain, elevation 
 South Tiger Mountain, elevation 
 West Tiger #1, elevation 
 West Tiger #2, elevation 
 West Tiger #3, elevation 

 Rattlesnake Ridge
 Rattlesnake Ledge, elevation 
 Rattlesnake Mountain (East Peak), elevation 
 Rattlesnake Mountain (West Peak), elevation

References

External links
Issaquah Alps Trails Club
Trail reviews of hikes in the Issaquah Alps at Hiking with my Brother

Cascade Range
Mountain ranges of Washington (state)
Landforms of King County, Washington